Men of the Mountain (Italian: Quelli della montagna) is a 1943 Italian war drama film directed by Aldo Vergano and starring Amedeo Nazzari, Mariella Lotti and Mario Ferrari. Along with The Three Hundred of the Seventh, it was one of a handful of films portraying the Alpini units of the Italian Army.

It was shot at Cinecittà Studios in Rome. The film's sets were designed by the art director Vittorio Valentini.

Cast
 Amedeo Nazzari as Il tenente Andrea Fontana 
 Mariella Lotti as La dottoressa Maria Algardi 
 Mario Ferrari as Il capitano Piero Sandri 
 Ori Monteverdi as Pina 
 Cesco Baseggio as Il maggiore 
  Nico Pepe as Il tenente medico Giordano 
 Nino Cobelli as Martorello 
 Giuseppe Pagliarini as Morticoni 
 Sennuccio Benelli as Varale 
 Walter Lazzaro as L'aiutante del maggiore

References

Bibliography 
 Ruth Ben-Ghiat. Italian Fascism's Empire Cinema. Indiana University Press, 2015.

External links 
 

1943 films
Italian black-and-white films
1940s Italian-language films
Films directed by Aldo Vergano
Films shot at Cinecittà Studios
Lux Film films
1940s war drama films
Italian war drama films
Films set in the Alps
1943 drama films
1940s Italian films